Cawthon is a surname of British origin. It is a variant of the toponymic surname Cawthorne. Cawthon may refer to:

Pete Cawthon (1898–1962), American football coach
Rainey Cawthon (1907–1991), American football player and coach
Scott Cawthon (born 1978), American video game designer

See also
Cawthorne (surname)

References

Surnames of British Isles origin